Auditory means of or relating to the process of hearing:

 Auditory system, the neurological structures and pathways of sound perception
 Auditory bulla, part of auditory system found in mammals other than primates
 Auditory nerve, also known as the cochlear nerve is one of two parts of a cranial nerve
 Auditory ossicles, three bones in the middle ear that transmit sounds
 Hearing (sense),  the auditory sense, the sense by which sound is perceived
 Ear, the auditory end organ
 Cochlea, the auditory branch of the inner ear
 Sound, the physical signal perceived by the auditory system
 External auditory meatus, the ear canal
 Primary auditory cortex, the part of the higher-level of the brain that serves hearing
 Auditory agnosia
 Auditory exclusion, a form of temporary hearing loss under high stress
 Auditory feedback, an aid to control speech production and singing
 Auditory hallucination, perceiving sounds without auditory stimulus
 Auditory illusion, sound trick analogous to an optical illusion
 Auditory imagery, hearing in head in the absence of sound
 Auditory learning, learning by listening
 Auditory phonetics, the science of the sounds of language
 Auditory scene analysis, the process by which a scene containing many sounds is perceived
 Auditory science, concerning the perception of sound